Strandzha Glacier is located on Burgas Peninsula, eastern Livingston Island in the South Shetland Islands, Antarctica northeast of Ropotamo Glacier, south of Sopot Ice Piedmont and southwest of Pautalia Glacier. It is bounded by Delchev Peak to the west, Spartacus Peak, Trigrad Gap and Yavorov Peak to the northwest, and by Elena Peak to the north, extends 1.6 km in northeast-southwest direction and 800 m in northwest-southeast direction, and flows southeastward into Bransfield Strait.

The feature is named after Strandzha Mountain, Bulgaria.

Location
Bulgarian mapping in 2005 and 2009.

See also
 List of glaciers in the Antarctic
 Glaciology

Maps
 L.L. Ivanov et al. Antarctica: Livingston Island and Greenwich Island, South Shetland Islands. Scale 1:100000 topographic map. Sofia: Antarctic Place-names Commission of Bulgaria, 2005.
 L.L. Ivanov. Antarctica: Livingston Island and Greenwich, Robert, Snow and Smith Islands. Scale 1:120000 topographic map.  Troyan: Manfred Wörner Foundation, 2009.

References
 Strandzha Glacier. SCAR Composite Antarctic Gazetteer
 Bulgarian Antarctic Gazetteer. Antarctic Place-names Commission. (details in Bulgarian, basic data in English)

External links
 Strandzha Glacier. Copernix satellite image

Glaciers of Livingston Island